The Paraguay women's national futsal team represents Paraguay in international women's futsal competitions. It is overseen by the Paraguayan Football Association (APF) in FIFA competitions and by the Federación Paraguaya de Fútbol de Salón (FPFS) in AMF competitions.

Honours

FIFA
South American Women's Futsal Championship:
 Third place (1): 2011
South American Games:
 Champions (1): 2022 Asunción

AMF
AMF Futsal Women's World Cup:
 Fouth place (1): 2017

See also
Paraguay national futsal team (Men's team)

References

External links
 FIFA
 CONMEBOL

Par
futsal
Women's football in Paraguay